A Letter Concerning Toleration by John Locke was originally published in 1689. Its initial publication was in Latin, and it was immediately translated into other languages. Locke's work appeared amidst a fear that Catholicism might be taking over England, and responds to the problem of religion and government by proposing religious toleration as the answer. This "letter" is addressed to an anonymous "Honored Sir": this was actually Locke's close friend Philipp van Limborch, who published it without Locke's knowledge.

Background

In the wake of discovery of the Rye House Plot and Charles II's persecution of the Whigs, Locke fled England to Amsterdam in the Dutch Republic in September 1683. Throughout his life, Locke had taken an interest in the debate about religious toleration. The question was much debated in Holland during Locke's stay, and in October 1685 Louis XIV of France revoked the Edict of Nantes that had guaranteed religious toleration for French Protestants.

In the Dutch Republic, Locke met Philipp van Limborch, a Professor of Divinity, and it was to be a discussion with Limborch that persuaded Locke to temporarily put aside his work on An Essay Concerning Human Understanding and put forth his ideas on toleration. Locke wrote the Letter during the winter of 1685–86.

Argument of the Letter
One of the founders of Empiricism, Locke develops a philosophy that is contrary to the one expressed by Thomas Hobbes in Leviathan, in supporting toleration for various Christian denominations. Hobbes did allow for individuals to maintain their own religious beliefs as long as they outwardly expressed those of the state, however, and it has been argued that Locke's rejection of Catholic Imperialism was the ultimate basis for his rejection of government's interest in spiritual salvation.

"That church can have no right to be tolerated by the magistrate," Locke argued, "which is so constituted that all who enter it ipso facto pass into the allegiance and service of another prince". If this were to be tolerated, "the magistrate would make room for a foreign jurisdiction in his own territory and...allow for his own people to be enlisted as soldiers against his own government". This has been interpreted by historians as a reference to the Catholic Church, with the Pope being the prince to whom Catholics owed allegiance.

However, more recently scholars have challenged the idea that Locke opposed the toleration of Catholics in all circumstances. Mark Goldie argues that the traditional interpretation of Locke's position on Catholics "needs finessing, since he did not, in fact, exclude the theoretical possibility of tolerating Catholics...if Catholics could discard their uncivil beliefs, they could then be tolerated". Goldie asserts that Locke was opposed not to Catholicism as such but antinomianism, the belief that ordinary moral laws are superseded by religious truth. Scott Sowerby also claims that Locke left open the possibility that Catholics could be tolerated if they adopted tolerant principles and rejected political allegiance to the Pope.

John Marshall has argued that a number of passages in the Letter demonstrate that Locke believed that Catholics "in their terms of worship and religious speculative beliefs...deserved their worship to be free". Marshall also notes that "The combination of Locke’s comments in the Letter suggest that during [its] composition ... Locke was once again struggling over how to discriminate between the series of associated political principles which for him made Catholics intolerable, and the religious worship and other religious beliefs of Catholics which deserved toleration." A confirmation of these positions seems to come from a 2019 discovery of a previously unknown manuscript, dated to 1667–8, titled , in which Locke makes his earliest arguments for religious toleration.<ref>The Guardian, 'Unknown text by John Locke reveals roots of foundational democratic ideas', 3 September 2019.</ref>

In one of the last paragraphs, Locke argued against atheists: "Lastly, those are not at all to be tolerated who deny the being of a God. Promises, covenants, and oaths, which are the bonds of human society, can have no hold upon an atheist. The taking away of God, though but even in thought, dissolves all; besides also, those that by their atheism undermine and destroy all religion, can have no pretence of religion whereupon to challenge the privilege of a toleration. As for other practical opinions, though not absolutely free from all error, if they do not tend to establish domination over others, or civil impunity to the Church in which they are taught, there can be no reason why they should not be tolerated." This critique excluded all atheistic varieties of philosophy and all attempts to deduce ethics and natural law from purely secular premises. There exists also a passage added in a later edition of the Essay concerning Human Understanding, where Locke perhaps questioned "whether 'atheism' was necessarily inimical to political obedience."

Toleration is central to Locke's political philosophy. Consequently, only churches that teach toleration are to be allowed in his society. Locke’s view on the difficulty of knowing the one true religion may suggest that religion is not personally important to Locke, but it also may point to the deep uncertainties surrounding religious belief in a time of political and intellectual conflict. In contrast, Locke’s view on atheism suggests that he was far from considering religion as unimportant. As an empiricist, he took practical considerations into account, such as how the peace of civil society will be affected by religious toleration. A close reading of the text also reveals that Locke relies on Biblical analysis at several key points in his argument.

Reception
There were immediate responses from the High Church Anglican clergy, published by Thomas Long and Jonas Proast. Long believed the letter was written by an atheistically disguised Jesuit plot for the Roman Catholic Church to gain dominance by bringing chaos and ruin to church and state. Proast attacked the Letter and defended the view that the government has the right to use force to cause dissenters to reflect on the merits of Anglicanism, the True Religion.  Locke's reply to Proast developed into an extended, controversial exchange.

Notes

References
Maurice Cranston, John Locke: A Biography (Oxford: Oxford University Press, 1985).
Mark Goldie (ed.), A Letter Concerning Toleration and Other Writings (Indianapolis: Liberty Fund, 2010).
J. W. Gough, John Locke's Political Philosophy: Eight Studies (Oxford: Clarendon Press, 1973).
Raymond Klibansky and J. W. Gough (eds.), Epistola de Tolerantia/A Letter on Toleration (Oxford: Clarendon Press, 1968).
John Marshall, John Locke, Toleration and Early Enlightenment Culture (Cambridge: Cambridge University Press, 2006). 
Scott Sowerby, Making Toleration: The Repealers and the Glorious Revolution'' (Cambridge, Massachusetts: Harvard University Press, 2013).

External links
 
 Full text
 
 Contains A Letter Concerning Toleration, slightly modified for easier reading

1689 books
Works by John Locke
Freedom of religion
Religion in England